Kim Jong-Man (born March 3, 1978), often anglicised  to Jong-Man Kim, is a South Korean mixed martial artist who currently competes in the Featherweight division. While Kim has mostly fought in South Korea, he has also appeared in many Japanese promotions including, the Sengoku Raiden Championships, DEEP, Shooto, K-1 Hero's, and Russia's M-1 Global. He last fought at TOP FC - Original against Seung Hwa-Han.

Kim is a member of Korea's Special Forces, from which he earned his nickname "Special Force."

Mixed martial arts record

|-
| Win
| align=center| 23–11–3 (1)
| Seung Hwa-Han
| KO (punch)
| TOP FC - Original
| 
| align=center| 2
| align=center| N/A
| Seoul, South Korea
| 
|-
| Win
| align=center| 22–11–3 (1)
| Aaron Steele
| TKO (punches)
| MC - Martial Combat 3
| 
| align=center| 5
| align=center| 4:25
| Sentosa, Singapore
| 
|-
| Loss
| align=center| 21–11–3 (1)
| Hideo Tokoro
| Decision (unanimous)
| Dynamite!! The Power of Courage 2009
| 
| align=center| 3
| align=center| 5:00
| Saitama, Japan
| 
|-
| Loss
| align=center| 21–10–3 (1)
| Hiroshi Nakamura
| Decision (unanimous)
| FMC 1 - Korea vs. Japan
| 
| align=center| 3
| align=center| 5:00
| Seoul, South Korea
| 
|-
| Loss
| align=center| 21–9–3 (1)
| Masanori Kanehara
| Decision (unanimous)
| World Victory Road Presents: Sengoku 7
| 
| align=center| 3
| align=center| 5:00
| Tokyo, Japan
| Sengoku Featherweight Grandprix Opening Round
|-
| Draw
| align=center| 21–8–3 (1)
| Daiki Hata
| Draw (unanimous)
| Deep: 37 Impact
| 
| align=center| 3
| align=center| 5:00
| Tokyo, Japan
| 
|-
| Loss
| align=center| 21–8–2 (1)
| Niko Puhakka
| Submission (triangle choke)
| M-1 Challenge 2: Russia
| 
| align=center| 1
| align=center| N/A
| St. Petersburg, Russia
| 
|-
| Loss
| align=center| 21–7–2 (1)
| Tomohiko Hori
| Decision (majority)
| The Khan 1
| 
| align=center| 3
| align=center| 5:00
| Seoul, South Korea
| 
|-
| Loss
| align=center| 21–6–2 (1)
| Akiyo Nishiura
| KO (punches)
| GCM - Cage Force EX Eastern Bound
| 
| align=center| 1
| align=center| 2:13
| Tokyo, Japan
| 
|-
| Draw
| align=center| 21–5–2 (1)
| Yoshiro Maeda
| Draw
| Deep: Protect Impact 2007
| 
| align=center| 3
| align=center| 5:00
| Osaka, Japan
| 
|-
| Win
| align=center| 21–5–1 (1)
| Hatsu Hioki
| Decision (split)
| Shooto: Gig Central 13
| 
| align=center| 3
| align=center| 5:00
| Nagoya, Japan
| 
|-
| Loss
| align=center| 20–5–1 (1)
| Masakazu Imanari
| Submission (armbar)
| Deep: 31 Impact
| 
| align=center| 1
| align=center| 3:28
| Tokyo, Japan
| For Deep Featherweight Title
|-
| Draw
| align=center| 20–4–1 (1)
| Yuji Hoshino
| Draw
| GCM Cage Force 3
| 
| align=center| 2
| align=center| 5:00
| Tokyo, Japan
| 
|-
| Loss
| align=center| 20–4 (1)
| Do Hyung Kim
| Decision (unanimous)
| NF Neo Fight 11
| 
| align=center| 2
| align=center| 5:00
| Seoul, South Korea
| 
|-
| Win
| align=center| 20–3 (1)
| Tae Hyun Bang
| Decision (unanimous)
| NF Neo Fight 11
| 
| align=center| 2
| align=center| 5:00
| Seoul, South Korea
| 
|-
| Win
| align=center| 19–3 (1)
| Hee Won Kim
| Submission (armbar)
| NF Neo Fight 11
| 
| align=center| 1
| align=center| 0:55
| Seoul, South Korea
| 
|-
| NC
| align=center| 18–3 (1)
| Kevin Roddy
| No Contest
| World Best Fighter USA vs. Asia
| 
| align=center| 1
| align=center| 4:57
| Atlantic City, New Jersey, United States
| 
|-
| Win
| align=center| 18–3
| Atsushi Yamamoto
| TKO (punches)
| Hero's 2005 in Seoul
| 
| align=center| 2
| align=center| 4:25
| Seoul, South Korea
| 
|-
| Loss
| align=center| 17–3
| Yong Jae Jun
| Decision (unanimous)
| G5 - Yungjin Pharm Middleweight Tournament Quarterfinals
| 
| align=center| 3
| align=center| 5:00
| Seoul, South Korea
| 
|-
| Win
| align=center| 17–2
| Jung Hwan Jung
| Submission (armbar)
| G5 - Yungjin Pharm Middleweight Tournament Second Round
| 
| align=center| 1
| align=center| 1:40
| Seoul, South Korea
| 
|-
| Win
| align=center| 16–2
| Hae Won Kim
| Submission (armbar)
| G5 Gimme Five
| 
| align=center| 1
| align=center| 2:24
| Seoul, South Korea
| 
|-
| Win
| align=center| 15–2
| Seong Hyun Ko
| TKO (punches)
| G5 Gimme Five
| 
| align=center| 1
| align=center| 1:58
| Seoul, South Korea
| 
|-
| Loss
| align=center| 14–2
| Lim Jae-Suk
| Submission (armbar)
| G5 - Motorola Middleweight Tournament Finals
| 
| align=center| 1
| align=center| 0:41
| Seoul, South Korea
| 
|-
| Win
| align=center| 14–1
| Yong Hyun Park
| Submission (heel hook)
| G5 - Motorola Middleweight Tournament Finals
| 
| align=center| 1
| align=center| 2:57
| Seoul, South Korea
| 
|-
| Win
| align=center| 13–1
| Sang Yong Kim
| Submission (heel hook)
| G5 - Motorola Middleweight Tournament Quarterfinals
| 
| align=center| 2
| align=center| 3:57
| Seoul, South Korea
| 
|-
| Win
| align=center| 12–1
| Hyo Sik Hong
| Decision (unanimous)
| G5 - Motorola Middleweight Tournament Second Round
| 
| align=center| 3
| align=center| 5:00
| Seoul, South Korea
| 
|-
| Win
| align=center| 11–1
| Jong Man Kim
| Decision (unanimous)
| G5 - Motorola Middleweight Tournament Opening Round
| 
| align=center| 3
| align=center| 5:00
| Seoul, South Korea
| 
|-
| Win
| align=center| 10–1
| Jin Woong Choi
| Submission (armbar)
| G5 Gimme Five
| 
| align=center| 2
| align=center| 2:11
| Seoul, South Korea
| 
|-
| Win
| align=center| 9–1
| Gi Han Kim
| Submission (armbar)
| G5 Gimme Five
| 
| align=center| 1
| align=center| 3:04
| Seoul, South Korea
| 
|-
| Win
| align=center| 8–1
| Dae Yeol Cho
| Submission (guillotine choke)
| G5 Gimme Five
| 
| align=center| 2
| align=center| 2:26
| Seoul, South Korea
| 
|-
| Win
| align=center| 7–1
| Ja Wook Kim
| Submission (guillotine choke)
| G5 Gimme Five
| 
| align=center| 2
| align=center| 3:19
| Seoul, South Korea
| 
|-
| Win
| align=center| 6–1
| Keon Song
| TKO (punches)
| G5 Gimme Five
| 
| align=center| 1
| align=center| 1:58
| Seoul, South Korea
| 
|-
| Win
| align=center| 5–1
| Nam Kim
| Submission (guillotine choke)
| G5 Gimme Five
| 
| align=center| 2
| align=center| 1:51
| Seoul, South Korea
| 
|-
| Win
| align=center| 4–1
| Byung Jo Kim
| Submission (kneebar)
| G5 Gimme Five
| 
| align=center| 3
| align=center| 2:40
| Seoul, South Korea
| 
|-
| Win
| align=center| 3–1
| Kyung Ho Park
| Submission (guillotine choke)
| G5 Gimme Five
| 
| align=center| 1
| align=center| 1:43
| Seoul, South Korea
| 
|-
| Win
| align=center| 2-1
| Jae Ho Lee
| Submission (kneebar)
| G5 Gimme Five
| 
| align=center| 2
| align=center| 2:03
| Seoul, South Korea
| 
|-
| Loss
| align=center| 1–1
| Lim Jae-Suk
| Submission (reverse armbar)
| NF 1 - Neo Fight 1
| 
| align=center| 1
| align=center| 4:25
| Seoul, South Korea
| 
|-
| Win
| align=center| 1–0
| Young Suk Ko
| Submission (reverse armbar)
| NF 1 - Neo Fight 1
| 
| align=center| 1
| align=center| 3:17
| Seoul, South Korea
|

References

External links

1978 births
Living people
South Korean male mixed martial artists
Lightweight mixed martial artists
Mixed martial artists utilizing boxing
Mixed martial artists utilizing judo
South Korean male judoka